Rutog County, (in ) is a county in Ngari Prefecture, Tibet Autonomous Region of the People's Republic of China. Rutog County shares a border with India.

The county has a rich history of folk tales, myths, legends, proverbs and folk songs and has many caves, rock paintings and other relics. It has a very low population density with a population of just over 10,000.

Name
'Rutog' is Tibetan for "mountain shaped like a spear and fork".

Geography and climate

Rutog County is located in northwestern Tibet, Ngari northwest with a number of territorial borders. It is divided into 12 townships and 30 village committees. The Karakoram Mountains go through the county.

Lakes in Rutog County include Bangda Lake, Guozha Lake, Longmu Lake, Lumajangdong Co, Wo Erba Lake and Pangong Tso.

Overall Rutog County has a rough subarctic climate with long, very cold, sometimes snowy winters and short, cool, humid summers (Dfc) owing its extreme altitude.

To the north, Rutog County shares borders with Hotan County (Hetian), Qira County (Cele) and Keriya County (Yutian) in Hotan Prefecture (Hetian), Xinjiang. To the east, the county borders Gêrzê County.

History
Rutog was part of the Maryul kingdom (modern Ladakh), when it was established in the 10th century. It was again consolidated as part of Ladakh during the reign of Sengge Namgyal, but was later conquered by Lhasa through the Tibet-Ladakh-Mughal War. Rutog and Ladakh continued to have extensive trading relations at all times, with occasional disputes over borders.

The headquarters of the region was at Old Rudok (Rutog Dzong), a hill top location, which boasted a fort as well as several monasteries. During the period of the British Raj in India, European visitors were expressly prohibited from visiting the Rudok, but the British official E. B. Wakefield managed to visit it in 1939.

With the 1950 Chinese annexation of Tibet, Rutog became part of the Tibet Autonomous Region of China.
In October 1983, the county seat was moved from Old Rudok to the village of Derub. The present Rutog Town was built sometime around 1999 a short distance away from Derub. The site of the new town appears to have been originally a suburb of the Derub village called Gyelgosang.

Administrative divisions
The only town is Rutog Town (Rituzhen,  ;) 

Townships
 Dungru Township (Tungru)
 Domar Township (Duoma;)
 Risong Township (Risum;)
 Rabang Township (Rebang;).

Demographics and economy

, the residents of the county were Tibetan.

Rutog County's economy is based around farming and animal husbandry. Aside from wool, butter, hides, cattle cashmere, etc. are produced. In Rutog County, the main growing crop is barley and yaks, sheep, goats, horses and other livestock are important to the economy. Rutog County has many wild animals and plants, including the black-necked crane, goose, wild yak, Tibetan antelope, Mongolian gazelle, black sheep, kiang, and bear. A number of rare animals are protected by the government and are of high value.  Known mineral resources are gold, lead, chromite, borax, and salt.

In the five years from 2006–2011, Rutog County produced 72 tons of cashmere wool worth 16 million yuan ($2.5 million USD in 2011). China produces 75% of the world's cashmere wool.

In 1984, the average per capita income of Rutog County residents was 478 yuan.

The China National Highway 219 passes through Rutog County.

Incidents
The local government dispatched rescuers and equipment to the site of the avalanche. The avalanche was described by NASA as one of the largest avalanches in history. On September 21, 2016, another similarly large avalanche occurred just to the south.

Historical maps
Historical maps including Rutog:

See also
 Aksai Chin
 2020 China–India skirmishes

Notes

References

External links

 ."China Tibet Information Centre"
 https://web.archive.org/web/20200522001714/http://rt.al.gov.cn/info/1073/4800.htm

Counties of Tibet
Ngari Prefecture